Mae Hong Son Airport  is an airport in the town of Mae Hong Son in Mae Hong Son Province, Thailand.

Airlines and destinations

External links

Mae Hong Son Airport, Dept of Civil Aviation
 

Mae Hong Son
Airports in Thailand
Buildings and structures in Mae Hong Son province
Airports established in 1939